Sir Alastair MacTavish  Dunnett (26 December 1908 – 2 September 1998) was a Scottish journalist and newspaper editor.  He edited The Daily Record newspaper for nine years and The Scotsman newspaper from 1956 to 1972.  In 1975 he became chairman of Thomson Scottish Petroleum and was much involved in the establishment of the oil terminal at Flotta in Orkney. From the 1950s to the 1980s he was involved in many Scottish cultural activities including being governor of the Pitlochry Festival Theatre (1958–1984).  He was awarded an honorary degree of LLD by the University of Strathclyde in 1978 and was knighted on 4 July 1995.

He published a book of short stories (Heard tell, 1947), a description of a kayaking voyage round the coast of Scotland (Quest by canoe, 1950, republished in 1969 as It's too late in the year and in 1996 as The canoe boys), several books on Scottish topics and an autobiography (Among friends, 1984).

Dunnett married Dorothy Halliday on 17 September 1946; as Dorothy Dunnett she was a celebrated artist and historical novelist, author of the Lymond Chronicles and The House of Niccolo.  They had two sons, Ninian and Mungo.

Bibliography

 Republished as: 
 Republished as:

References

Sources

1908 births
1998 deaths
Scottish newspaper editors
People from Inverclyde
20th-century Scottish businesspeople
Scottish short story writers
Scottish travel writers
Scottish autobiographers
The Scotsman people
Knights Bachelor
People educated at Hillhead High School
20th-century British historians
20th-century British short story writers